Bassariscus is a genus in the family Procyonidae. There are two extant species in the genus: the ringtail or ring-tailed cat (B. astutus) and the cacomistle (B. sumichrasti). Genetic studies have indicated that the closest relatives of Bassariscus are raccoons, from which they diverged about 10 million years ago in the Tortonian Age of the Miocene. The two lineages of Bassariscus are thought to have separated after only another two million years, making it the extant procyonid genus with the earliest diversification. Later diversification in the genus in the Pliocene and Pleistocene saw the emergence of two extinct species, Bassariscus casei and Bassariscus sonoitensis, respectively. Due to the more digitigrade stance of their legs compared to the plantigrade stance of other members of Procyonidae, some taxonomies place the genus as a separate family, Bassaricidae.. The name is a Greek word for fox ("bassaris") with a Latinized diminutive ending ("-iscus").  The genus was named by Elliott Coues in 1887, having previously been described by Lichtenstein in 1830 under the name Bassaris. Coues proposed the word "bassarisk" as the English term for animals in this genus.  Its habitat includes semi-arid areas in the southwestern United States, the whole of Mexico, as well as moist tropical forests in Central America.

Species

References

External links

Procyonidae
Mammal genera
Taxa named by Elliott Coues